Polkville can refer to:
 Polkville, Mississippi
 Polkville, North Carolina
Polkville, Kentucky